Real Mataram FC was a professional Indonesian football club based in Yogyakarta, SR Yogyakarta. The team were played in Liga Primer Indonesia. In the mid-season, they found themselves in 16th in the league, below their early season target. A massive player reformation has been carried out, in which twelve player including two foreign player terminated from their contracts. There are indications that second reformation have been planned, and Real Mataram are now sought to obtain local players from Special Region of Jogjakarta's Liga Indonesia Premier Division clubs.

Team officials

Last squad

References

External links
Real Mataram Official club website
Real Mataram at Liga Primer
Real Mataram at Facebook
The Royal Guards Official Supporter

Defunct football clubs in Indonesia
Football clubs in Indonesia
Association football clubs established in 2010
2010 establishments in Indonesia
Association football clubs disestablished in 2011
2011 disestablishments in Indonesia

w